George Peter Lanyon (8 February 1918 – 31 August 1964) was a British painter of landscapes leaning heavily towards abstraction. Lanyon was one of the most important artists to emerge in post-war Britain. Despite his early death at the age of forty-six he achieved a body of work that is amongst the most original and important reappraisals of modernism in painting to be found anywhere. Combining abstract values with radical ideas about landscape and the figure, Lanyon navigated a course from Constructivism through Abstract Expressionism to a style close to Pop.  He also made constructions, pottery and collage.

Lanyon took up gliding as a pastime and used the resulting experience extensively in his paintings.  He died in Taunton, Somerset, as the result of injuries received in a gliding accident and is buried in St. Uny's Church, Lelant.

In September 2010 Peter Lanyon’s work was honoured with a large-scale retrospective exhibition: Peter Lanyon 9 October 2010 – 23 January 2011 at Tate St Ives. Curated by Chris Stephens, Head of Displays and Curator of Modern British Art at Tate Britain, it was the first thorough museum retrospective for almost forty years. In 2015 Lanyon's Gliding Paintings were shown as a set in the Soaring Flight exhibition at the Courtauld Gallery, London.

In 2018 the catalogue raisonné of Peter’s oil paintings and three-dimensional works was published by Modern Art Press, after a decades work by Toby Treves.

Life and career
Peter Lanyon was born in St Ives, Cornwall, in 1918. He was the only son of W H Lanyon, an amateur photographer and musician. He was educated at Clifton College. St Ives remained his base and he received after-school painting lessons from Borlase Smart. In 1937 he met Adrian Stokes who is thought to have introduced him to contemporary painting and sculpture and who advised him to go to the Euston Road School where he studied for four months under Victor Pasmore.  In 1936–37 he also attended Penzance School of Art. In 1939 he met established artists Ben Nicholson, Barbara Hepworth and Naum Gabo who had moved to St Ives on the outbreak of the Second World War. Lanyon received private art tuition from Nicholson. The character of his work changed completely and he became very involved with making constructions. Throughout the 1940s the influence of Nicholson and Gabo remained very evident in his work. From 1940 to 1945 he served with the Royal Air Force in the Western Desert, Palestine and Italy.

In 1946 he married Sheila St John Browne (1918/19 – 18 November 2015). Their first child, Andrew Lanyon, was born in 1947.  Six children were born to the couple between 1947 and 1957; Andrew, Jane, Matthew, Martin, Anna and Jo.

In 1946 he also became an active member of the Crypt Group of Artists and a founder member of the Penwith Society of Arts in 1949. He travelled around Italy, with his wife Sheila Lanyon, in the summer of 1950 and became a leading figure in the St. Ives group of artists.

He had his first solo exhibition at the Lefevre Gallery, London in 1949 and taught at the Bath Academy of Art, Corsham from 1951 to 1957 (where William Scott was senior painting master). In 1950 he was invited by the Arts Council to contribute to their exhibition at the Festival of Britain. He spent four months in 1953 living in Italy on an Italian government scholarship. In 1954 he was awarded the Critics' Prize by the British section of the International Association of Art Critics. He ran an art school, St Peter's Loft, at St Ives from 1957 to 1960 with Terry Frost and William Redgrave and in 1959 he was awarded second prize at the 2nd John Moores Exhibition, Liverpool.

Lanyon's first New York show was held at the Passedoit Gallery in 1953 and his first solo New York show was at the Catherine Viviano Gallery in 1957. On the 1957 trip he met Mark Rothko, Motherwell and other artists, critics and collectors. Rothko's work particularly thrilled him. Lanyon was well received in New York and the increased demand for his work in the US combined with an expansion of work to the much larger scale of mural painting and in response to a new interest in gliding led to a looser and more open kind of painting.

Lanyon began training as a glider pilot in 1959, as he explained: "to get a more complete knowledge of the landscape". He used his gliding experiences as the basis for paintings that gave an aerial perspective to his native Cornish landscape right through to his death in a gliding accident in 1964.

In 1961 he was elected Chairman of the Newlyn Society of Artists and was elected a Bard of the Gorseth Kernow, with the bardic name Marghak an Gwyns (Rider of the Winds) for services to Cornish art. In 1962 he spent seven months painting a mural commissioned for the house of Stanley J Seeger in New Jersey, USA. The following year he spent three months as a visiting painter at the San Antonio Art Institute in Texas, as well as visiting Mexico. He travelled to Prague and Bratislava in 1964 to lecture for the British Council.

Lanyon died on 31 August 1964 at Taunton, Somerset, after a gliding accident.

See also

 St Ives, Cornwall
 List of St. Ives artists

References and sources
References

Sources
 Treves, Toby (2018) "Peter Lanyon: catalogue raisonne of the oil paintings and three-dimensional works" Modern Art Press 
 Treves, Toby, and Wright, Barnaby (2015) "Soaring Flight: Peter Lanyon's Gliding Paintings" Courtauld Gallery 
 Stephens, Christopher (2000) Peter Lanyon: at the edge of landscape. 21 Publishing 
 Garlake, Margaret (2003) "The Drawings of Peter Lanyon" Ashgate 
 Causey, Andrew (2006) "Peter Lanyon: Modernism and the Land" Reaktion Books 
 Stephens, Christopher (2010) "Peter Lanyon" Tate

External links

Peter Lanyon Tate Biography
Peter Lanyon at the Tate Collection

The British Council's Peter Lanyon collection

1918 births
1964 deaths
20th-century English painters
English male painters
Bards of Gorsedh Kernow
Painters from Cornwall
Glider pilots
People educated at Clifton College
People from St Ives, Cornwall
Royal Air Force personnel of World War II
St Ives artists
Aviators killed in aviation accidents or incidents in England
20th-century English male artists
Victims of aviation accidents or incidents in 1964